Rick Wilber is an American author, poet, editor and teacher. His novel, Alien Morning (Tor, 2016), was a finalist for the John W. Campbell Memorial Award for Best Science Fiction Novel of 2017, and other novels include The Cold Road (Tor 2003, ebook New Word City, 2017), and Rum Point (McFarland, 2010). He has published more than fifty short stories, novelettes or novellas in magazines such as Asimov's Science Fiction magazine, Analog magazine, Fantasy & Science Fiction magazine, Stonecoast Review, Gulf Stream Review, Pulphouse, and others; and in numerous anthologies.  His other books include the memoir, My Father's Game: Life, Death, Baseball (McFarland, 2008);several college textbooks, including Media Matters, (Kendall Hunt, 2018), Modern Media Writing, (Thomson/Wadsworth, 2003, with Randy Miller) Magazine Feature Writing, (Bedford/St. Martin's 1994) and "The Writer's Handbook for Editing and Revision" (NTC, 1997); and the collections, Rambunctious: Nine Tales of Determination, (WordFire Press, 2020) and The Wandering Warriors (with Alan Smale, WordFire Press, 2020) Where Garagiola Waits (University of Tampa Press, 1999), and To Leuchars (Wildside Press, 2003), The Secret Skater, (Winning Readers, University of Tampa Press, 1996, as Robin Aran)

Wilber is the editor of several anthologies including Field of Fantasies: Baseball Stories of the Strange and Supernatural (Night Shade Books, 2014), Subtropical Speculations: An Anthology of Florida Science Fiction (1991), Future Media (Tachyon Books, 2011), Making History: Classic Alternate History Stories, New Word City, 2018.

His short fiction includes "Something Real" won the 2012 Sidewise Award for Alternate History, Short Form.

He is currently Visiting Assistant Professor of Creative Writing and Thesis Coordinator in the low-residency MFA program at Western Colorado University. He was previously an adjunct instructor in creative writing at Florida Gulf Coast University, and variously a director, instructor, and assistant professor at the University of South Florida. Prior to that he was an assistant professor at Florida Southern College and Southern Illinois University-Edwardsville.

His journalism background includes part-time copy editing in the 1970s and 1980s for The Ledger, in Lakeland, FL and The Tampa Tribune in Tampa, FL. He served as wire editor of the Belleville (IL) News Democrat and as pop music critic for the St. Louis Globe Democrat.

Wilber's father was baseball player Del Wilber, which has influenced much of his writing, both fictional ("Where Garagiola Waits") and non-fictional (My Father's Game). One of his children has Down syndrome, and this has also influenced much of his writing.

Bibliography

Novels
 Rum Point (2009), 
 The Cold Road (2003), 
 Alien Morning (2016),

Short fiction
Collections
 Where Garagiola Waits, and Other Baseball Stories (1999)
 To Leuchars (2003)
Anthologies
 
Short stories and novellas

 Thinking of Romance (1981)
 Waiting for the Call (1982)
 Suffer the Children (1988)
 Mary Alice Blue Eyes (1989)
 War Bride (1990)
 Helmet (1991)
 Greggie's Cup (1992)
 Calculating Love (1992)
 Ice Covers the Hole (1992)
 Being Ernest (1993)
 With Twoclicks Watching (1993)
 A Falling Out (1993)
 Bridging (1994)
 Hope as an Element of Cold Dark Matter (1994)
 American Jokes (1994)
 With White Deer Gone (1994)
 Elements of Self-Destruction (1995)
 Virolec and the Beast (1995)
 Hope As an Element of Cold, Dark Matter (1995)
 Mounting the Monkeys (1995)
 Swimming with Gort (1995)
 Run Down West (1996)
 The Babe, the Iron Horse, and Mr. McGillicuddy (1997) with Ben Bova
 Where Garagiola Waits (1997)
 Straight Changes (1998)
 In Boise (1999)
 Imagine Jimmy (1999)
 In Boise (2000)
 Stephen to Cora to Joe, or, the Truth As I Know It, or, Shifty Paradigms: The Use of Literary Icons and Sports Motifs in Speculative Fiction (2000)
 To Leuchars (2000)
 Arribada (2000)
 Blind Spot (2010) with Nicholas A. DiChario
 Several Items of Interest (2010)

 Something Real (Moe Berg Mysteries Book 1) (2014) - Originally published in Asimov's Science Fiction, April/May 2012, and winner of the 2012 Short Form Sidewise Award for Alternate History 
 At Palomar (2013)
 Walking to Boston (2015)
 Rambunctious (2016)
 In Dublin, Fair City (2017)
 Today is Today (2018) 
 The Secret City (2018)
 The Wandering Warriors (with Alan Smale) (2018)
 Donny Boy (2019)
 Ithaca (with Brad Aiken) (2020)
 False Bay (2020)
 The Hind (with Kevin J. Anderson (2020)

Poetry
Collections
 The Impaler in Love (1991)
 A Falling Out (1993)
 The Murderer Explains (1994)
 Deposed, He Remembers Her on the Morning of His Death (1995)
 Following Her Divorce (1995)
 Metaphysics at the Planetarium (1995)
 Homer (1997)

Non-fiction
 Subtropical Speculations: An Anthology of Florida Science Fiction (Richard Mathews and Rick Wilber, 1991)
 Magazine Feature Writing (1994)
 The Writer's Handbook for Editing & Revision (Aug 1996)
 Modern Media Writing (by Rick Wilber and Randy Miller, 2002)
 My Father's Game: Life, Death, Baseball (November 12, 2007)
 Future Media (2011, published by Tachyon Publications.)
 Media Matters (2018, Kendall Hunt publishing)

References 

1948 births
Living people
American editors
American male poets
Asimov's Science Fiction people
The Magazine of Fantasy & Science Fiction people
Male novelists
Sidewise Award winners